uniq is a utility command on Unix, Plan 9, Inferno, and Unix-like operating systems which, when fed a text file or standard input, outputs the text with adjacent identical lines collapsed to one, unique line of text.

Overview
The command is a kind of filter program. Typically it is used after sort. It can also output only the duplicate lines (with the -d option), or add the number of occurrences of each line (with the -c option). For example, the following command lists the unique lines in a file, sorted by the number of times each occurs:

$ sort file | uniq -c | sort -n

Using uniq like this is common when building pipelines in shell scripts.

History
First appearing in Version 3 Unix, uniq is now available for a number of different Unix and Unix-like operating systems. It is part of the X/Open Portability Guide since issue 2 of 1987. It was inherited into the first version of POSIX and the Single Unix Specification.

The version bundled in GNU coreutils was written by Richard Stallman and David MacKenzie.

A uniq command is also part of ASCII's MSX-DOS2 Tools for MSX-DOS version 2.

The command is available as a separate package for Microsoft Windows as part of the GnuWin32 project and the UnxUtils collection of native Win32 ports of common GNU Unix-like utilities.

The  command has also been ported to the IBM i operating system.

See also
 List of Unix commands

References

External links

 
 
 
 SourceForge UnxUtils – Port of several GNU utilities to Windows

Unix text processing utilities
Unix SUS2008 utilities
Plan 9 commands
Inferno (operating system) commands
IBM i Qshell commands